Stained Glass Arts and Fine Arts College (French: L'Ecole de Vitrail et de Création) is a school in Monthey, Switzerland offering instruction leading to a Glass Craftsman diploma.

External links
Stained Glass Arts and Fine Arts College Website

Art schools in Switzerland
Organisations based in Monthey
Stained glass